Utscheid is a municipality in the district of Bitburg-Prüm, in Rhineland-Palatinate, western Germany.

Geography 
Utscheid is located in the Southern Eifel Nature Park. Worth mentioning is the Michelbach flowing through the town, which flows into the Radenbach at Niederraden.

In addition to the main town include the districts Buscht, Glashütte, Hamerskaul, Neuhaus and Rußdorf to the community.

Neighboring municipalities are Fischbach-Oberraden, Weidingen, Hütterscheid, Baustert, Brimingen and Niederraden.

Local council 
The municipal council in Utscheid consists of eight council members, who were elected in a majority vote at the local election on 25 May 2014, and the honorary mayor as chairman. By 2009, the council had twelve council members.

Population

Culture and sights

Structures 
 The church of St. Peter from 1746, with partly from the Middle Ages preserved tower, has an extensive Baroque equipment
 Catholic rectory of 1767
 The 16 m high circular water tower from 1956 - and rebuilt in 1993 by Oswald Mathias Ungers 
 Large farmhouse of 1800
 Crossroads (Tines-Kreuz) of 1756 
 Residential and holiday home  Villa Glashütte  with pitched roof, built in the years 1986-88 by Oswald Mathias Ungers, on the edge of the municipality boundary, south of the villages Buscht and Russdorf, in a forest valley on Läschbach on the site of the former glassworks. 
 Municipal House - a conversion of the residential and warehouse of the former national product trade  Weber  by Oswald Mathias Ungers

Green areas and recreation 
 Nature reserve "Tongrube bei Utscheid" 
 Hiking routes for example Michelbachtal, Glashütte or Fischbach
 Premium hiking trails of the Southern Eifel Nature Park
 Gliding area Utscheid

Regular events 
 The annual church community festival is celebrated on Sunday after June 29 (Peter & Paul).
 Traditional ratchets or rattles on Good Friday and Holy Saturday
 Hut burning on the first weekend after Ash Wednesday (so-called Scheef Sunday)

Photos

Literature 
 Ernst Wackenroder: Rheinprovinz. – Die Kunstdenkmäler der Rheinprovinz. Die Kunstdenkmäler des Kreises Bitburg. Bd.12/I. Düsseldorf 1927. 4to. X, 315 S. Mit 12 Taf. u. 227 Abb. im Text. Seite 232. .
 Pfarrei Utscheid 1330–1980. Festschrift / Hrsg. anläßl. d. Konsekration d. Pfarrkirche u. d. Orgelweihe, verb. mit d. 650jähr. Pfarrjubiläum, am 24.08.1980. Nebst. Beil. Bitburg. Burbach 1980.
 Pfarrhaus Utscheid umfassend renoviert und erweitert. In: Paulinus. Jg. 115. Trier 1989. Nr. 6. S. 30.
 Adolf Valentin, Johanna Roder, Egon Kirchen: 3 kleine Kapellen in unserer Heimat. In: Geschichtlicher Arbeitskreis der Pfarrei Baustert, Eifel (Hrsg.): Heimatbuch ous der Bouster Poar. Baustert Mai 2014, S. 117–121.
 Adolf Valentin: Die Glashütte bei Utscheid im Wandel der Zeit. In: Heimatkalender für den Kreis Bitburg-Prüm. 1980, S. 100–102.
 Johannes Nosbüsch (1929): „Watt mol wor“: der Schulweg. In: Heimatkalender Landkreis Bitburg-Prüm. 2007, S. 117–125.
 Martin Kieren: Eine Wiese, ein Haus: ein Versuch, mit der Form zu überleben: Oswald Mathias Ungers’ Haus in der Eifel. In: Deutsche Bauzeitung. 129, Juni 1995, S. 84–91.
 Lothar Monshausen: Ein Barockkreuz in Utscheid-Buscht. In: Heimatkalender Eifelkreis Bitburg-Prüm. 65. 2016, S. 129–130.
 Thomas Wieckhorst: Bescheidenheit und Zurückhaltung: Umnutzung eines kleinen Wasserturms in Utscheid zu Wohnzwecken. In: Bausubstanz. 12. Februar 1996, S. 26–28.
 Agnes Colling: Kulturdenkmal vor dem Verfall gerettet. In: Ous der Heemicht. Nr. 8, Juli 1997, S. 15–16.
 Rudolfine Schröter: Hügelgräber von Outscheid, Krs. Bitburg. In: Trierer Zeitschrift für Geschichte und Kunst des Trierer Landes und seiner Nachbargebiete. 30. 1967, S. 62–69.

External links 

 Local Portrait of Utscheid
 Tourist site of Utscheid
 Check future of Utscheid 2014
 About Utscheid

References

Bitburg-Prüm